Montague may refer to:

Places

Australia
 Montague Road, Adelaide
 Montague, a neighbourhood in South Melbourne, Victoria
 Montague Street Bridge, South Melbourne
 Montague Street light rail station, South Melbourne

Canada
 Montague, Ontario
 Smiths Falls-Montague Airport
 Montague, Prince Edward Island
 Lower Montague, Prince Edward Island
 Montague-Kilmuir, an electoral district
 Montague Gold Mines, Nova Scotia
 Montague Harbour
Montague Harbour Marine Provincial Park
 Montague Road, Prince Edward Island

United Kingdom
 Montague Road, London
 Montague Street, London
 Shepton Montague Somerset, England
Montagu House, Bloomsbury, the first home of the British Museum, also known as Montague House
Montagu House, Portman Square, built for Elizabeth Montagu on Portman Square
Montagu House, Whitehall, another London mansion

United States
 Montague Island (Alaska)
 Montague, California
 Montague Airport (California)
 County Route G4 (California), the Montague Expressway, in the Silicon Valley
 Montague station in San Jose, California
 Montague, Massachusetts
 Montague Road, Mass south of Montague Center
 Montague Center Historic District
 Gill–Montague Bridge
 Montague City Road Bridge
 Montague Township, Michigan
 Montague, Michigan
Henry Montague House in Kalamazoo, Michigan, which was listed on the National Register of Historic Places in 1983
 Montague, Missouri
 Montague Township, New Jersey
 Milford–Montague Toll Bridge
 Montague, New York
 Brooklyn, New York
 Montague Street Tunnel
 Montague-Court Building
 Montague, North Carolina
 Montague County, Texas
 Montague, Texas
 Montague Independent School District

Elsewhere
 535 Montague, a minor planet orbiting the Sun
 Montague Island (disambiguation)

People with the name
Montague (given name)
Montague (surname)

Arts, entertainment, and media

Fictional characters
 Montague family, one of the main families in the play Romeo and Juliet by William Shakespeare
 Monty Bodkin, a fictional character in three novels of English comic writer P. G. Wodehouse
 Montague (Johnny Test) the mouse, a cartoon character
 Montague Egg, a fictional amateur detective
 Dr. John Montague, one of the main characters in Gothic horror novel The Haunting of Hill House
 Montague "Monty" D'Ysquith Navarro, a main character in the musical comedy A Gentleman's Guide to Love and Murder
 The real name of Duck the Great Western Engine, a character from Thomas The Tank Engine & Friends.

Other uses in arts, entertainment, and media
Montague (album), a 2020 album by Hov1
 "Montague Road", a song by Laura Veirs on her album The Triumphs and Travails of Orphan Mae
 I Capuleti e i Montecchi (The Capulets and the Montagues), an opera by Bellini
 Montagues and Capulets, also known as Dance of the Knights, from Prokofiev's ballet Romeo and Juliet

Schools
 Montague Regional High School, Canada
 Montague Road School, England, which was replaced by The National Academy

Ships
 HMS Montague (1654)
 Montague (brigantine), patrol and settlement vessel, Nova Scotia, 1758-1760
 USS Montague (AKA-98), Andromeda-class attack cargo ship

Other uses
 Montague Bicycles
 Montague grammar, an approach to natural language semantics
 Montague Hospital, South Yorkshire, England
 Montague's harrier, a migratory bird of prey
 Montague (horse)

See also 
  without "e"
 
 
 Montagu (disambiguation)
 Montagu House (disambiguation)
 Montaigu (disambiguation)